Emile Wessels (born 27 June 1979) is a rugby union player who plays for . Wessels plays as a fly-half, specialising in kicking. He made his international debut in October 2002 in a friendly match against . He played four matches at the 2003 Rugby World Cup finals and two matches the 2007 Rugby World Cup finals. Wessels was born in Windhoek.

References

1979 births
Living people
Namibia international rugby union players
Namibian people of German descent
Namibian rugby union players
Rugby union fly-halves
Rugby union players from Windhoek
White Namibian people